The 2006 Big Ten Conference football season was the 111th season for the Big Ten Conference.  The season began on Thursday, August 31, 2012 when Northwestern played Miami (Ohio) and Minnesota played Kent State. The season concluded on January 8, 2007 when Big Ten champion Ohio State lost in the BCS National Championship Game to the Florida Gators.

Preseason
Wisconsin athletic director Barry Alvarez was also the head coach of the team the previous season in 2005. After 15 years of coaching he decided to step down as head coach of the football team and chose Bret Bielema to succeed him.

In June 2006 Northwestern head coach Randy Walker unexpectedly died when he suffered an apparent heart attack. Northwestern alum and linebacker coach at the time Pat Fitzgerald was named his successor. The hiring made Fitzgerald the youngest Division I-A at the time of the hiring.

Following a disappointing season in which his team went 7-5 Lloyd Carr promoted defensive backs coach Ron English to defensive coordinator.

Bowl games

Awards
Heisman Trophy: Troy Smith, Ohio State
Walter Camp Award: Troy Smith, Ohio State  
Associated Press College Football Player of the Year Award: Troy Smith, Ohio State 
Bronko Nagurski Trophy: James Laurinaitis, Ohio State
Chuck Bednarik Award: Paul Posluszny, Penn State 
Davey O'Brien Award: Troy Smith, Ohio State
John Mackey Award: Matt Spaeth, Minnesota 
Lombardi Award: LaMarr Woodley, Michigan 
Mosi Tatupu Award: A. J. Trapasso, Ohio State
Outland Trophy: Joe Thomas, Wisconsin  
Ted Hendricks Award: LaMarr Woodley, Michigan

References